Aldo Boffi (26 February 1915 – 26 October 1987) was an Italian professional footballer who played as a striker. At club level, he played for Italian sides Seregno, AC Milan and Atalanta, and he represented the Italy national football team at international level.

Club career
Boffi played club football with Seregno, AC Milan and Atalanta. During the 1938–39 season, he was joint-capcannonieri (top scorer) in Serie A, along with Ettore Puricelli of Bologna, with 19 goals; he managed the same feat in the 1939–40 and 1941–42 Serie A seasons, with 24 and 22 goals respectively.

International career
Boffi made two appearances for Italy between 1938 and 1939.

Career statistics

Club

Honours
Individual
Serie A Top-scorer: 1938–39, 1939–40, 1941–42

References

1915 births
1987 deaths
Italian footballers
Italy international footballers
Serie A players
Serie B players
A.C. Milan players
Atalanta B.C. players
U.S. 1913 Seregno Calcio players
Association football forwards